Bo Henning Lennart Grahn (6 October 1947 – 16 July 2018) was a Finnish athlete. He represented Borgå Akilles until 1968, after which he transferred to Esbo Idrottsförening.

At the 1966 European Junior Games in Odessa, Grahn placed fourth. Six years later, he competed in the men's shot put at the 1972 Summer Olympics. Grahn was the third shotputter to be accepted into the 20 metre club thanks to his put of 20.09 m in Helsinki on 3 August 1972.

References

External links
 

1947 births
2018 deaths
Athletes (track and field) at the 1972 Summer Olympics
Finnish male shot putters
Olympic athletes of Finland
People from Porvoo
Sportspeople from Uusimaa
20th-century Finnish people
21st-century Finnish people